Caio Da Cruz Oliveira Queiroz (born 3 March 2002) is a Brazilian professional footballer who plays as a who plays as a forward for Gorica of the Croatian First Football League.

Club career
Nine months after signing a contract with Croatian side Gorica until the summer of 2023, Caio Da Cruz impressed with his performances and extended his contract to the summer of 2025.

References

External links

2002 births
Living people
People from Espírito Santo
Brazilian footballers
First Football League (Croatia) players